Jacques François Fernand Lematte (26 July 1850 - 1929) was a French painter. He was born at Saint-Quentin, Aisne and studied in Alexandre Cabanel's studio at the École des beaux-arts de Paris, winning the Prix de Rome with The Death of Messalina (1870) and staying at the Villa Medici in Rome from 1871 to 1874.

References

1850 births
1929 deaths
19th-century French painters
20th-century French painters
20th-century French male artists
People from Saint-Quentin, Aisne
19th-century French male artists